The Penguin Award is an annual award given for excellence in broadcasting by the Television Society of Australia. It was founded in 1954. The award trophy depicts an ear listening to a television tube, but strongly resembles a penguin, hence the name. The award was designed by Des White, an artist and designer at the Australian Broadcasting Corporation.

Past winners

1970 

Special Award: Outstanding Achievement in Television, 1969 Moon Telecasts – Dept of Supply, Australian Government (coordinating agency in Australia for NASA)

November 1972 
Leading Quizmaster – Tony Barber, The Great Temptation, Channel 7
Leading Drama Talent – TIE – James Laurenson, Boney and Michael Pate, Matlock Police, Network 10
Leading National Newsreader – Brian Naylor
Commonwealth Film Development Corporation $3000 TV Drama Prize – Division 4: Episode 'The Return of John Kelso'
Special Commendation – Over There. Episode 'A Long Way From The Junction', ABC
Shell $2000 Documentary Award – A Big Country. Episode 'The Whalers', ABC
Best Supporting Actor in a Television Series  – Frank Taylor (Australian actor), Division 4
Leading Variety Talent – Mary Jane Boyd – Matt Flinders Show, ABC
Leading Reporter Current Affairs – Richard Carleton, This Day Tonight, ABC
Best Variety Series – The Matt Flinders Show, ABC
Best Current Affairs Program – A Current Affair, Network 9
The Society's Trophy – Mr C.L. Faudell. Founder & Past President of the TV Society of Australia

1973 
Presented in a joint function with the Australian Film Institute Awards in Melbourne on 2 December 1973.
Best Drama Series – Seven Little Australians, ABC
Best Children's Show – Seven Little Australians, ABC
Best Actor – Leonard Teale – Seven Little Australians, ABC
Best Supporting Actress – Ruth Cracknell – Seven Little Australians, ABC
Best Variety Series – Showcase '73
Best Single Program – Malaysia....Where are all the Children going?, Network 10
Best Current Affairs Show – A Current Affair, Network 9
Best Variety Entertainer – Jill Perryman, Perryman on Parade, ABC
Best Newsreader – Geoff Raymond, ABC
Best Current Affairs Presentation – Mike Willesee, A Current Affair
Best Drama Script – Frank Hardy, Boney Episode: Boney Meets the Daybreak Killer

November 1975 
Best Actor – John Meillon, The Fourth Wish, ABC
Best Actress – Olivia Hamnett, Rush, ABC
Best Variety Entertainer – Garry McDonald
Best Newsreader/Reporter – Geoff Raymond, ABC
Best Current Affairs Interviewer – Richard Carleton, ABC
Best Script – Michael Craig, The Fourth Wish, ABC
Best Producer/Director – Oscar Whitbread, Rush, ABC
Best Documentary – Wildlife in Papua New Guinea and Nation Emerging
Best Adult Drama – They Don't Clap Losers
Best Original Theme Music – Rush, ABC

1976 
Best Actor – John Waters for Rush (ABC)
Best Actress – Penne Hackforth-Jones for Tandarra
Best Supporting Actor – George Mallaby for Power Without Glory (ABC)
Best Supporting Actress – Heather Canning for Power Without Glory (ABC)
Best Drama Series – Power Without Glory (ABC)
Best Variety Series – The Don Lane Show (Channel 9)
Best Variety Special – Neil Diamond – Thank You Australia Concert (9 Network)
Best Children's Program – Solo One (Crawford Productions)
Best Musical – The Fool on the Hill (ABC)
Best Current Affairs Interviewer – Mike Walsh
Best Variety Entertainer – Don Lane
Best Original Music – Mike Brady for Solo One
Best Current Affairs Program – Four Corners (ABC)
Best Documentary – A Big Country (ABC)

Source:

November 1977 
Best Actor – Peter Adams, The Alternative
Best Actress – Wendy Hughes, The Alternative
Best Supporting Actor – Alwyn Kurts, The Alternative
Best Supporting Actress – Arianthe Galani, Pig in a Poke, ABC
Australian Film Commission $3000 Prize in Adult Drama – The Alternative
Australian Film Commission Open Drama – Pig in a Poke, ABC
Best Drama Script – Pig in a Poke, ABC
Best Individual Production Achievement – Power Without Glory, ABC
Best Drama Director – Carl Schultz, The Tichborne Affair, ABC
Best Variety Musical Entertainer – Don Lane
Best Newsreader – Brian Naylor
Best Documentary Script – Fred Cul Cullen, Australians at War, Network 10
Best Drama Production One Shot – The Tichborne Affair, ABC
Best Variety Musical Program Series – The Don Lane Show, Network 9
Best Variety Musical Program Special – Sammy Davis Jr in Australia, Channel 7
Best Current Affairs – Four Corners
Best Documentary – In the Wild with Harry Butler
Best Children's Program – Fat Cat & Friends
Best Outside Broadcast – Centenary Test Cricket Match, ABC
Best Imported Program – The Duchess of Duke Street

November 1979 
Best Documentary – A Big Country, ABC
The Shell Prize for Best News Story – The Heathcote Fires, Channel 9
Best Comedy Program – Neutral Ground, ABC
Best Variety Series – The Don Lane Show, Channel 9
Best Adult Drama – Bit Part, ABC
Best Children's Drama – Top Mates, ABC
Best Children's Program – Shirl's Neighbourhood, Channel 7
Best Current Affairs Show – Countrywide, ABC
Best Sustained Performance by an Actor in a Series – Peter Adams, Cop Shop
Best Sustained Performance by an Actress in a Series – Carol Burns, Prisoner
Best Single Performance by an Actress – Jill Perryman, Palace of Dreams, ABC
Best Entertainer – Don Lane, Channel 9
Best New Talent – Liddy Clark, Ride on Stranger, ABC
Best Television Play Direction – Peter Weir, The Plumber, Channel 9
The $1000 Adult Drama Prize – The Summer of the 17th Doll, Channel 7
Best Set Design – Against the Wind, Channel 7
Best Musical Score – Against the Wind, Channel 7
Best Camera Work – Against the Wind, Channel 7
The Colin Bednall Award for Outstanding Contribution – Ian Fairweather

November 1980 
Best Single Performance by an Actor – John Hargreaves, The Banana Bender, ABC
Best Sustained Performance by an Actor in a Series – Brian James, Skyways, Channel 7
Best Single Performance by an Actress – Bunny Brooke, Rock Pool, ABC
Best Sustained Performance by an Actress in a Series – Vivien Gray, The Sullivans, Channel 9
Best TV Play or TV Movie Direction – Kevin Dobson, Young Ramsay
Best Current Affairs Program – 60 Minutes, Channel 9
Best Documentary – Do Not Pass Go

1982 
Best Drama Series – A Town Like Alice, Channel 7
Best Light Entertainment Series – Parkinson in Australia, Network 10
Best Light Entertainment Program – Women's Weekly Fashion Awards
Best Musical Program – The Don Lane Show, Channel 9
Best Children's Light Entertainment – The Curiosity Show
Best Current Affairs – Nationwide, ABC
Best Sporting Telecast – 1981 VFL Grand Final
Best Sustained Performance by an Actor in a Series – Bryan Brown, A Town Like Alice, Channel 7
Best Sustained Performance by an Actress in a Series – Rowena Wallace, Sons & Daughters
Best Light Entertainment Personality – Ian Turpie, The New Price is Right
Best Newsreader – Jim Waley, Channel 9
Best Children's TV Personality – Humphrey Bear
Best TV Play or TV Movie Direction – Di Drew, 1915, ABC
Best Drama Script – Out of Line, ABC
Best Drama Series Script – Peter Yeldham, 1915, ABC
Best Musical Score – Shirl's Neighbourhood, Channel 7
Best Costume Design – Jim Murray, 1915, ABC
Best Set Design & Best Editing – The Women's Weekly Fashion Awards

November 1983 
Best Drama Program – The Dean Case, ABC
Best Limited-Mini Series Drama Program – The Dismissal, Channel 10
Best Drama Serial – Carson's Law, Channel 10
Best Children's Drama – Kicking Around
Best Musical-Variety Series – The Daryl Somers Show, Channel 9
Best Light Entertainment Non-Musical Series – Sale of the Century, Channel 9
Best Variety Program – Sydney Entertainment Centre Opening, Channel 9
Best Current Affairs – Focus
Best News Program – Eye Witness News, Channel 10
Best News Story – The Azaria Chamberlain Case, Channel 10
Best Documentary – Birdmen of Kilimanjaro, Channel 10
Best Sports Telecast – The Commonwealth Games, ABC
Best Single Performance by an Actor in a Limited Miniseries – Bill Hunter, The Dismissal, Channel 10
Best Single Performance by an Actor in a Series – William Zappa, Women of the Sun
Best Sustained Performance by an Actor in a Serial/Series – Kevin Miles, Carson's Law, Channel 10
Best Single Performance by an Actress in a Series – Mawuyul Yanthaluwuy, Women of the Sun
Best Single Performance by an Actress in a Serial – Sally McKenzie, Cop Shop, Channel 7
Best Sustained Performance by an Actress in a Serial/Series – Rowena Wallace, Sons & Daughters, Channel 7
Best Light Entertainment Personality – Bert Newton, The Don Lane Show, Channel 9
Best Newsreader – David Johnston, Channel 10
Best TV Play or TV Movie Direction – George Miller, The Dismissal, Channel 10
Best Drama Series Script – Sonia Borg & Hyllus Maris, Women of the Sun
Best Drama Serial Script – Terry Stapleton, Carson' Law, Channel 10
Best Lighting & Best Set Design – Carson's Law, Channel 10

1984 
Best Variety Program – Wak's Works, Channel 7 Brisbane

1985 
Best Miniseries Drama Program – All the Rivers Run (Channel 7)
Best Light Entertainment Production – Australia You're Standing In It (ABC)
Best Single Performance by an Actor in a Serial – Frank Gallacher for A Country Practice (Channel 7)
Best Single Performance by an Actor in a Miniseries – Jack Thompson for Waterfront (Channel 10)
Best Single Performance by an Actress in a Miniseries – Greta Scacchi for Waterfront (Channel 10)
Best Performance by an Actor in a Miniseries – Henri Szeps for Palace of Dreams (ABC)
Best Single Drama Performance by an Actor – Warren Mitchell for Man of Letters
Best Single Performance by a Supporting Actress – Dinah Shearing for Man of Letters
Best Performance by an Actress in a Supporting Role in a Miniseries – Kris McQuade, Palace of Dreams
Best Sustained Performance by an Actress in a Series – Lorraine Bayly for Carson's Law (Channel 10)
Best Light Entertainment Personality – Ian Turpie for The New Price is Right (Channel 7)
Best Newsreaders – David Johnson and Jo Pearson, Eyewitness News (Channel 10)
Best Current Affairs Personality – Jim Waley for Sunday (Channel 9)
Best Light Entertainment Variety Series – Paul Hogan's England (Channel 9)
Best Current Affairs – Sunday (Channel 9)
Best Musical Score or Song – Bruce Rowland for All the Rivers Run (Channel 7)
Best Children's Affairs Personality – Mr. Squiggle
Best TV Play or Telemovie Direction – Michael Jenkins for Scales of Justice (ABC)
Critics Award for Excellence in TV Program Production – Sunday (Channel 9)
Colin Bednall Award for Excellence – Bobby Limb
Special Award for Excellence in 28 Years in the Industry – Alf Potter

Source:

1986 

Best Drama Serial – Prisoner (Channel 10)
Best Miniseries – The Dunera Boys (Channel 10)
Best Situation Comedy – Mother and Son (ABC)
Best One-off Drama – The Perfectionist (Channel 10)
Best Sustained Performance by an Actor in a Principal/Supporting Role in a Series/Serial – Mark Little for The Flying Doctors (Network Nine)
Best Performance by a Supporting Actor in a One-off Drama – Simon Chilvers for The Dunera Boys (Channel 10)
Best Performance by an Actor in a Principal Role in a One-off Drama – Shane Connor for Emerging (ABC)
Best Performance by an Actor in a Series – Max Cullen for The Flying Doctors
Best Performance by an Actress in a Principal Role in a One-off Drama – Dasha Blahova for Displaced Persons (ABC)
Best Performance by an Actress in a Series – Glenda Linscott for Prisoner (Network Ten)
Best Sustained Performance by an Actress in a Series – Ruth Cracknell for Mother and Son (ABC)
Best Performance by a Supporting Actress in a One-off Drama – Julia Blake for The Dunera Boys (Channel Ten)
Best Miniseries Script – Ben Lewin for The Dunera Boys (Channel Ten)
Best News Program – Eyewitness News – Russell Street Bombing
Best Current Affairs – Sunday (Network Nine)
Best Newsreader – Brian Naylor
Best Documentary – Coup d'État (ABC)
Best Sporting Telecast – 1985 Australian Grand Prix (Network Nine)
Critics Award – Four Corners (ABC)
Best Children's Drama – Top Kids (ATV10)
Colin Bednall Award for Lifetime Achievement – Jim Fisher, Chief engineer of HSV7

Source:

1987 

Best One-off Drama/Miniseries – Vietnam (Network Ten)
Best Drama Series or Serial – Rafferty's Rules (Channel Seven)
Best Light Entertainment Program – Hey Hey It's Saturday (Channel Nine)
Best One-off Variety Program – Elton John – Tour De Force (ABC)
Best Current Affairs Program – Four Corners: "Dead Heart" (ABC)
Best News Program – "Clifton Hill Massacre" (HSV-7)
Best Television Documentary – Suzi's Story (Network Ten)
Best Sporting Telecast – 1987 Australian Grand Prix (Network Nine)
Best Performance By a Male Actor in a Principal Role in a One-off Drama – Drew Forsythe for Whose Baby? (Channel Seven)
Best Performance By a Female Actor in a Principal Role in a One-off Drama – Anne Phelan for The Harp in the South (Network Ten)
Best Performance By a Female Actor in a Supporting Role in a One-off Drama – Lisa Crittenden for Whose Baby? (Channel Seven)
Best Performance By a Male Actor in a Series/Serial – Gerard Kennedy for The Flying Doctors (Network Nine)
Best Performance By an Actress in a Series/Serial – Anne Charleston for Neighbours (Network Ten)
Best Sustained Performance By an Actress in a Series – Anne Haddy for Neighbours (Network Ten)
Best Light Entertainment Personality – Max Gillies (ABC)
Best News Presenter – Brian Naylor (Network Nine)
Best Current Affairs Presenter – Andrew Olle for Four Corners (ABC)
Best Weather Presenter – Rob Gell – (Network Ten)
Best Sports Presenter – Sandy Roberts – (Channel Seven)
Best Educational Programme – Curriculum by Design – Producer: T. Guthridge

Source:

1988 

Best Miniseries – The Shiralee (Channel Seven)
Best Drama Series – Rafferty's Rules (Channel Seven)
Best Actor in a Series – Peter Carroll for Rafferty's Rules
Best Scriptwriter, Drama Series – Michael Cove for Rafferty's Rules
Best Children's Drama – Peter and Pompey
Best Scriptwriter for One-off Drama – John Misto for Peter and Pompey
Best Children's Program – Kaboodle
Best Juvenile Actor – Damien Walters for Captain Johnno
Best Light Entertainment Program – Hey Hey It's Saturday
Best Special Event – John Farnham, Age of Reason Live at the Expo Concert
Best Comedy – The Comedy Company (Channel Ten)
Best News Program – National Nine News
Best Current Affairs – Page One (Channel Ten)
Best Sports Telecast – Australian Open tennis final (Channel Seven)
Best Documentary – Out of Sight, Out of Mind
Best Actor in a One-off Drama – Steve Bisley for The Clean Machine (Channel Ten)
Best Actress in a One-off Drama – Anne Phelan for Poor Man's Orange (Channel Ten)
Best Actress in a Serial – Lenore Smith for The Flying Doctors (Channel Nine)
Best Male Presenter – Jim Waley for Sunday
Best Female Presenter – Helen Wellings for The Investigators
Special Award for Documentary – Nature of Australia: A Portrait of the Island Continent: A Separate Creation
Special Award for Camera Work – David Parer
Special Award for Achievement in Victorian Television – Keith Taylor
Special Award for Special Event – Australia Live: The Celebration of a Nation – Peter Faiman
Special Award for Achievement – Geoffrey Robertson's Hypotheticals for "Blood on the Wattle"
Colin Bednall Award for Lifetime Achievement – Eric Pearce

Source:

1989 

Best Miniseries – Edens Lost (ABC)
Best Drama Series – The Flying Doctors (Nine Network)
Best Drama Serial – Neighbours (Channel Ten)
Best Children's Drama – A Waltz Through the Hills
Best Children's Program – Wild Wombat (Channel Seven)
Best Light Entertainment Program – The Money or the Gun (ABC)
Best Special Event Program – John Farnham and the MSO
Best Comedy Program – Fast Forward (Channel Seven)
Best News Program – National Nine News
Best Weekly Current Affairs Program – Four Corners (ABC)
Best Daily Current Affairs Program – A Current Affair (Nine Network)
Best Sports Program – 1989 Australian Masters (Channel Seven)
Best Documentary – Nobody's Children
Colin Bednall Award for Lifetime Achievement – Marie Trevor, producer

Source:

1990 
Held at the Hilton Hotel, Melbourne on 1 December 1990.
Best News Story – Fall of the Berlin  Wall (Nine Network)
Best Light Entertainment Program – Burke's Backyard
Best Drama Serial – Home and Away
Best Sports Program
Best  Sports Presenters
Best Light Entertainment  Presenter
Best Sports Reporter – Stephen Phillips, Channel Nine

See also 
 List of television awards

References

External links 
Television Society of Australia Awards at the Internet Movie Database

Australian television awards
Awards established in 1954